Toto Wong Kwan-to (born 15 November 1999) is a Hong Kong swimmer. She competed in the women's 50 metre backstroke event at the 2017 World Aquatics Championships.

References

External links
 

1999 births
Living people
Hong Kong female backstroke swimmers
Place of birth missing (living people)
Swimmers at the 2018 Asian Games
Asian Games silver medalists for Hong Kong
Asian Games medalists in swimming
Medalists at the 2018 Asian Games
Swimmers at the 2020 Summer Olympics
Olympic swimmers of Hong Kong